The 1932 Rutgers Queensmen football team represented Rutgers University in the 1932 college football season. In their second season under head coach J. Wilder Tasker, the Queensmen compiled a 6–3–1 record, won the Middle Three Conference championship, and outscored their opponents 159 to 58.

Schedule

References

Rutgers
Rutgers Scarlet Knights football seasons
Rutgers Queensmen football